Iceland competed at the 1968 Summer Olympics in Mexico City, Mexico.

Results by event

Athletics

Men
Field events

Combined events – Decathlon

Swimming

Men

Women

Weightlifting

Men

References
Official Olympic Reports
Part Three: Results

Nations at the 1968 Summer Olympics
1968
Summer Olympics